Matthew J. Van Wagenen is a United States Army major general who currently serves as deputy chief of staff for operations (DCOS-OPS) of Allied Command Operations in the Supreme Headquarters Allied Powers Europe. He was previously the deputy commanding general of V Corps at Victory Forward in Poznan, Poland and another prior assignment was as the chief of staff of operations of NATO, Allied Rapid Reaction Corps. He served as deputy commanding general of the 3rd (United Kingdom) Division and the 1st Cavalry Division, and as the commander of Task Force Southeast in Gardez City, Paktia Province, Afghanistan, from March to August 2017. He has participated in numerous combat operations, such as the Battle of Ramadi in 2006.

Military career
Van Wagenen is an ROTC graduate of Marquette University, class of 1991. Early in his career, Van Wagenen was assigned to Erlangen, Germany, as Tank Platoon Leader and Battalion Motor Officer in the 2nd Brigade, 1st Armored Division in 1992. Afterwards, he was assigned as a Troop Executive Officer to 3–4 Cavalry Regiment, 3rd Infantry Division to Schweinfurt, Germany, from November 1993 to September 1995. After completing Advanced Courses from Fort Knox, Kentucky, he was assigned as an Assistant Operations Officer, 2d Brigade, 3d Infantry Division in Georgia from April 1996 to May 1997. In 1997, Van Wagenen was assigned to Commander of A Company, 1st Battalion, 64th Armor Regiment, 2nd Brigade in Georgia. Afterwards, he was an observer and Controller with Operations Group Combat Maneuver Training Center Hohenfels, Germany, in 1999. In 2004, he was assigned to SGS 7th Army Training Command Grafenwoehr, Germany. Then, he was assigned as an executive officer to the Bandits 1–37 Armor Regiment during the Battle of Ar Ramadi and Anbar Awakening till February 2007. In June 2008, Van Wagenen was the Commander of 1–34 Armor in Fort Riley, Kansas, at Camp Funston running training for Military Intern Training Teams. Afterwards, he activated and commanded the 4th Squadron, 4th United States Cavalry of the 1st Brigade 1st Infantry Division till May 2010. From May 2010 to July 2013, Van Wagenen Was Division G-3, Chief of Operations for the 1st Infantry Division for 36 months, which included deployment to Regional Command East Afghanistan during the Surge.

From July 2013 to June 2014, Van Wagenen was a senior service college fellow at George C. Marshall European Center for Security Studies, Germany. He was then appointed as commander of the 3d Armored Brigade Combat Team, 1st Cavalry Division, Fort Hood, Texas for two years. In June 2016, he became executive officer to the Director of the Army Staff, Office of the Chief of Staff of the Army. In April 2017, Van Wagenen was Deputy Commanding General (Support), 1st Cavalry Division, Fort Hood, Texas and Operation Freedom's Sentinel, Afghanistan.

From June 2018 to October 2019, Van Wagenen was Deputy Commanding General, 3rd (United Kingdom) Division in the United Kingdom. From October 2019 to May 2021 he was assigned as Deputy Chief of Staff for Operations, Allied Rapid Reaction Corps, North Atlantic Treaty Organization, United Kingdom.

In July 2021, Van Wagenen was promoted to major general.

In April 2022, Van Wagenen was assigned to become the deputy chief of staff for strategic employment of the Supreme Headquarters Allied Powers Europe.

Dates of rank

Awards and decorations

References

Living people
Recipients of the Legion of Merit
United States Army generals
United States Army personnel of the Iraq War
United States Army personnel of the War in Afghanistan (2001–2021)
Year of birth missing (living people)